Wayne Scott Rosenthal (born February 19, 1965) is a former Major League Baseball pitcher and pitching coach.

Early life 
Rosenthal, who is Jewish, was born in Brooklyn, New York.  He attended South Shore High School, where he played for the basketball team and the 1982 New York City champion baseball team that was 31–1. He then attended St. John's University on scholarship, where he was the top pitcher on the baseball team.  He earned All-Tournament honors for the Redmen in helping them to their 1986 Big East Conference baseball tournament championship.

Professional career

Playing career 
He was drafted in 1986 by the Texas Rangers. On August 18, 1991, he recorded the only save of his career during a 9–4 victory over the Indians. After a season with the independent Duluth–Superior Dukes, he retired as a player.

Post-playing career 
In , Rosenthal joined the Montreal Expos organization as the pitching coach of the minor league Cape Fear Crocs. In , he served as the Expos' minor league pitching coordinator. He continued to work in the Marlins organization until , including a second stint as minor league pitching coordinator which is a position he holds today.

Rosenthal currently lives in Palm Beach Gardens, Florida.

References

External links

Pura Pelota (Venezuelan Winter League)

1954 births
Living people
Baseball players from New York (state)
Charlotte Rangers players
Duluth-Superior Dukes players
Florida Marlins coaches
Gastonia Rangers players
Gulf Coast Rangers players
Jewish American baseball players
Jewish Major League Baseball players
Major League Baseball pitchers
Major League Baseball pitching coaches
Oklahoma City 89ers players
Sportspeople from Brooklyn
Baseball players from New York City
St. John's Red Storm baseball players
St. John's University (New York City) alumni
Texas Rangers players
Tiburones de La Guaira players
American expatriate baseball players in Venezuela
Tulsa Drillers players
21st-century American Jews